The next Czech legislative election will be held in or before October 2025. All 200 members of the Chamber of Deputies of the Czech Republic will be elected and the leader of the resultant government will become the Prime Minister.

Background
The 2021 legislative elections saw the conservative alliance Spolu (consisting of the Civic Democratic Party (ODS), KDU-ČSL and TOP 09) finish first with 27.8% of the vote. ANO 2011 finished second and liberal alliance Pirates and Mayors third. Freedom and Direct Democracy was the only other party to win seats. Spolu formed a government with Pirates and Mayors with ODS leader Petr Fiala as Prime Minister.

Soon after the 2021 elections, the leader of the Mayors and Independents, Vit Rakušan, said that his party would run in the next elections as a single party rather than continue their alliance with the Pirate Party. According to internal Pirate Party analysis, the Mayors violated their joint agreement by asking their voters to give their candidates preference votes on the joint list, which resulted in just four Pirate MPs being elected.

On 8 February 2023, Babiš announced he would limit his role within ANO 2011. He would remain as an MP and the leader of the party, while Karel Havlíček and Alena Schillerová would become the primary faces of the party, with Havlíček becoming leader of the shadow cabinet.

On 23 February 2023, Jiří Paroubek launched the initiative Nespokojení (Dissatisfied), with the aim of connecting parties on the left of the political spectrum before the 2024 European elections and next parliamentary elections.

Pre-election composition

Opinion polls

Party polling

Coalition polling

References 

Future elections in the Czech Republic
Legislative elections in the Czech Republic